Lukaiasta (also, Lueayasta) is a former Kalindaruk (related to Ohlone) settlement in Monterey County, California.

Its precise location is unknown.

References

Costanoan populated places
Former Native American populated places in California
Former settlements in Monterey County, California